is a Shinto shrine located in Nishikyō-ku, Kyoto Prefecture, Japan.

Ōharano is dedicated to the Fujiwara tutelary kami, Amenokoyane, who was said to have assisted in the founding of the state.

History
The shrine became the object of Imperial patronage during the early Heian period.  In 965, Emperor Murakami ordered that Imperial messengers were sent to report important events to the guardian kami of Japan. These heihaku were initially presented to 16 shrines including the Ōharano Shrine.

Beppyo shrines

See also 
 List of Shinto shrines
 Twenty-Two Shrines
 Modern system of ranked Shinto Shrines

Notes

References
 Breen, John and Mark Teeuwen. (2000).  Shinto in History: Ways of the Kami. Honolulu: University of Hawaii Press. 
 McCullough, Helen Craig and Tsurayuki Ki. (1985).   Kokin Wakashū: The First Imperial Anthology of Japanese Poetry. Stanford: Stanford University Press. 
 Ponsonby-Fane, Richard. (1962).   Studies in Shinto and Shrines. Kyoto: Ponsonby Memorial Society. 
 . (1959).  The Imperial House of Japan. Kyoto: Ponsonby Memorial Society. 

Shinto shrines in Kyoto